The Tramway Museum, St Kilda is Australia's principal museum of the 19th and 20th century trams of Adelaide, South Australia. It is operated by the Australian Electric Transport Museum (SA) Inc., a not-for-profit volunteer organisation affiliated with the Council of Tramway Museums of Australasia. It is dedicated to the study, conservation and restoration of trams that were used in Adelaide or built there, and likewise with a small bus and trolleybus collection. Trams provide rides for visitors along a  purpose-built track between the museum and a large adventure playground.

Scope

The museum is one of very few transport museums in the world holding at least one example of every principal tram type to have been in service on a city street system.

From a vacant site in 1958, the museum in 2022 housed 25 electric trams, 2 horse trams, a tram-hauled horsebox, five trolleybuses, and a diesel bus of the type that operated when the street tram network was closed in 1958. Museum features include an entrance gallery, bookshop, interpretative displays and archive. Maintenance and construction facilities include two workshops, a wheel lathe building, ancillary storage sheds and a "travelling workshop", a former Melbourne W2 class tram.

Staffed by volunteers, the museum relies mainly on visitor admissions to fund its work. Major projects are supported by donations from museum members and occasional grants from South Australian Government museum assistance programs and the Salisbury Council. The council crucially secured funding from a 1972 state government unemployment relief scheme to lay the all-important tramway from the museum site alongside St Kilda Road towards the sea, and to erect poles for overhead wiring.

Development
In 1958, work started at the  museum site with the arrival of donated vehicles: the first were four trams from Adelaide's Municipal Tramways Trust (MTT), which that year had closed its street tram network, leaving intact only the mainly enclosed Glenelg tram line. The museum opened as a static display in 1967.  The tramway commenced trials in 1973 and was officially opened in 1974, coinciding with St Kilda's centenary. Subsequently, workshops were built to restore trams to operating condition; additional depots between 1980 and in 2001 to house the increasing number of trams in the collection; and in 2017 the original depot and workshop was replaced by a new facility.

Fleet

Displayed next to it is tram no. 15 of the Adelaide, Unley and Mitcham Tramway Company, in the deteriorated condition that is a common starting point for many restoration tasks of tramway museums.

The electric era, which started in 1909, was under the management of the MTT, a body established in late 1907 and governed mainly by councillors nominated by local governments. After 1958, there remained only the  line from Glenelg to the geographic centre of Adelaide. About 85% of the line was in its own reserved corridor, and a 1957 study of the economic and physical features of the line had concluded that the good state of the track and rolling stock would allow the tramway to continue for about ten years, when its future would be reviewed. Another report recommended that the right of way be converted to a "sturdy" pavement solely for a bus service; but funding never eventuated. It was to be another 47 years before a tramways renaissance began.

The museum holds at least one tram of each main type from the MTT era. Its collection also includes two Melbourne trams. One, W-class Melbourne tram no. 294, was built in Adelaide by Holden's Body Builders, the predecessor of General Motors-Holden; the other (W7 class 1013), which offers a comparison with the MTT's fast-loading Type F cars, has been modified for easy wheelchair access. A third fast-loader is a Sydney R1 Class tram, lent by the Sydney Tramway Museum.

Trolleybuses preserved are a 1925-built Garford, a 1937 AEC 661T, a 1942 double-deck Leyland, a 1945 single-deck Leyland whose chassis was originally destined for Canton, China (now Guangzhou), and a 1952 Sunbeam MF2B. A 1954 AEC Regal IV motor bus is also preserved.

Operations
The museum is classified as a rail transport operator under the provisions of the Rail Safety National Law Act 2012 (SA) and must now employ the stringent operational documentation and procedures that apply to all contemporary Australian railways. During the severe Covid-19 pandemic restrictions of 2019 and 2020, the museum ceased running trams while it undertook the major task of upgrading its operational documentation and procedures to meet the requirements of the Office of the National Rail Safety Regulator. During that period, the Salisbury Council was able to undertake some major improvements on the line: easing and re-laying the curve at a level crossing in new grooved rail, and re-laying a second level crossing; replacing some overhead poles; and re-hanging overhead wires to match the new track alignment. In May 2021, the public tram service resumed on Sunday afternoons and additionally on Wednesdays during school holidays and on public holidays.

Gallery

Notes

References

Tram museums
Transport in Adelaide
Tram transport in South Australia
Railway museums in South Australia
Museums in Adelaide
Adelaide
Adelaide